Oroquieta,(formerly/originally known as Layawan), officially the City of Oroquieta, is a 4th class component city and capital of the province of Misamis Occidental, Philippines. According to the 2020 census, it has a population of 72,301 people.

Etymology
Some sources reveal that the town got its name from the barrio in Spain where Father Toas Tomas Casado, the first parish priest, and General Domingo Moriones y Murillo, a hero in the Battle of Oroquieta, were born.

Another version is that Oroquieta had derived its name from the words oro (gold) and quita or kita (to find), in reference to the early inhabitants who had found gold along the river.

History
Layawan was the original name of Oroquieta, which was the barrio in the province of Misamis since 1861 until 1879. The early settlers then of the barrio were Boholanos. They found so many stray animals along the river, thus they named the place Layawan, which means a place of stray animals. A little later, Misamis was divided into two provinces, Misamis Occidental and Oriental. Then in 1880, Layawan changed its name to Oroquieta when it became a town.

Oroquieta became the capital (cabecera) on January 6, 1930. As capital town, people of various neighboring provinces came and inhabited in the place where they earn their living through fishing, farming, merchandising and other forms of businesses. Soon afterwards its income increased simultaneously with increase in population.

In 1942, Oroquieta was made the capital of the free Philippines by the recognized guerrillas and later the ongoing troops of the Philippine Commonwealth Army. (Personal interview with the late Atty. Vicente Blanco, Municipal Mayor during the Japanese Occupation) During this time, President Manuel L. Quezon, together with Sergio Osmeña Sr., a bodyguard and Major Manuel Nieto Sr., landed in Oroquieta after their evacuation from Corregidor to Australia.

The seat of government of the Free Philippines then was the Capitol. The Free Philippine Government was then issuing Misamis Occidental emergency notes. President Quezon, upon knowing that Oroquieta was made a capital of the Free Philippines and that the town was issuing emergency notes, authorized the Printing of the Mindanao emergency note.

Cityhood

Oroquieta was created a city under Republic Act 5518 and inaugurated as a chartered city on January 1, 1970. The charter converting the municipality of Oroquieta into a city were signed by President Marcos on June 25, 1969, in the presence of the then City Mayor Ciriaco C. Pastrano, with the newly elected councilors and other city officials.

Geography
Oroquieta City is bounded on the south by Aloran and the north by Lopez Jaena. On the eastern side is Iligan Bay, with Concepcion on the southwest and Sapang Dalaga on the northwest. Lowland plains and coastal lowlands are located in the city's eastern side while highlands and mountains tower over its western side.

Climate

Barangays
Oroquieta City is politically subdivided into 47 barangays. Population 2015 census.

Demographics

Economy

Government

Elected officials
Members of the Oroquieta City Council (2019-2022) Team Kita ang Oroquieta 20-0:
Mayor: Lemuel Meyrick M. Acosta, I.E.
Vice Mayor: Atty. Jorge T. Almonte
Congressman (1st District): Diego "Nonoy" C. Ty, C.E.
Councilors:
Sol Jude D. Gamalinda, C.E.
Jessie "Jecjec" S. Amboang
Joel B. Aclao
Donna R. Iyog
Ret. Col. Isaias "Jun" U. Claros Jr., AFP
Vincent J. Guantero
Arthur Q. Enanoria, DMD
Noel B. Undag Sr.
Aileen "Ai-ai" M. Taladua, RPh
Diosebel M. Maghinay
Alfredo Y. Bolleno Jr. (ABC President)
Heinrich Von L. Gonzaga (Federated SK Chairman)
Jolly T. Gumolon (IPMR)

Members of the Oroquieta City Council (2022-2025) Team Asenso Oroquieta:
Mayor: Lemuel Meyrick M. Acosta, I.E.
Vice Mayor: Aurora Virginia “Jie-jie” M. Almonte
Congressman: Jason P. Almonte 
Councilors:
Vincent J. Guantero 
Joel B. Aclao 
Sol Jude D. Gamalinda, C.E.
Ret. Col. Isaias “Jun” U. Claros Jr., PA
Joel A. Fernandez 
Jessie “Jecjec” S. Amboang 
Aileen “Ai-ai” M. Taladua, RPh
Arthur Q. Enanoria, DMD 
Noel B. Undag Sr.
Diosibel M. Maghinay
Alfredo Y. Bolleno Jr. - ABC President
Heinrich Von L. Gonzaga - SK Federation Chairman
Jolly T. Gumolon - IPMR

Healthcare
Hospitals and healthcare facilities:
 Misamis Occidental Provincial Hospital
 St. Therese Hospital
 Dignum Foundation Hospital
 Oroquieta Community Hospital
 Tamola-Tan Medical Center

Education
Students coming from Lanao del Norte, Zamboanga del Sur, Zamboanga del Norte and Misamis Occidental come to Oroquieta to pursue their college education.

Secondary schools:
 Misamis Occidental National High School
 Talairon National High School
 Oroquieta City National High School
 Mobod Integrated School
 Misamis Occidental Science and Technology High School
 Senote National High School
 Rizal National High School
 Bunga National High School
 Stella Maris College

See also
 Cagayan de Oro

Notes

External links

 
 [ Philippine Standard Geographic Code]
Local Governance Performance Management System

Cities in Misamis Occidental
Provincial capitals of the Philippines
Misamis Occidental
Component cities in the Philippines